Qiniangshan is a mountain in Nan'ao Subdistrict, Dapeng Peninsula. At 869 metres above sea level, it is the second tallest mountain in Shenzhen after Wutongshan. It is located within the Dapeng National Geopark.

References

Longgang District, Shenzhen
Geography of Shenzhen
Dapeng New District